Andrei Gabriel Istrate (born 15 March 2002) is a Romanian professional footballer who plays as a forward for Liga II club Viitorul Târgu Jiu, on loan from FCSB II.

Career statistics

Club

Honours

Club 
FCSB

 Cupa României: 2019–20

References

2002 births
Living people
Romanian footballers
Association football forwards
Liga I players
Liga II players
FC Steaua București players
FC Politehnica Iași (2010) players
ACS Viitorul Târgu Jiu players